The Asian sheepshead wrasse, Semicossyphus reticulatus, or the Kobudai, is a species of wrasse, one of the largest, native to the western Pacific Ocean, where it is only known from around the Korean Peninsula, China, Japan, and the Ogasawara Islands, where it inhabits rocky reef areas. This species is valued as a food fish in its native range.

The Asian sheepshead wrasse, also known as kobudai in Japan, is a hermaphroditic species, meaning that it has both male and female organs which allows it to change its sex. The species gained media attention when the transformation was caught on camera by the BBC Earth crew while filming in the waters near Sado Island, Japan. In 2017, it was shown on the Blue Planet II episode "One Ocean".

According to Great Big Story, Japanese diver Hiroyuki Arakawa has had a 30-year relationship with a sheepshead wrasse in Japan's Tateyama Bay, where he is the caretaker for an underwater Shinto shrine. He calls the fish, named "Yoriko", by hitting a bell on the underwater shrine.

References

Semicossyphus
Fish of Korea
 Labridae
Taxonomy articles created by Polbot
Fish described in 1839